Shideh (also Romanized as Shīdeh) is a village in Hombarat Rural District, in the Central District of Ardestan County, Isfahan Province, Iran. At the 2006 census, its population was 17, in 11 families.
At the 2015 its population was 8, in 4 families.
Mr. Seyed Mohamad Hosseini Shideh and Mr. Haj Seyed Mirza Hassan Hosseini Shideh were most great people of this village.

References 

Populated places in Ardestan County